Final Curtain was a 22-minute television pilot written and directed by Ed Wood in 1957. It starred Duke Moore as an actor wandering an empty theater after dark, where he is haunted by creepy sounds and eerie sights. The film is narrated by Dudley Manlove. Both Moore and Manlove also appear in Wood's cult film Plan 9 from Outer Space. Wood had hoped to use the film as the pilot for a television series he intended to produce called Portraits of Terror.

Some scenes where the actor explores the theater were later inserted into Wood's 1959 film, Night of the Ghouls, with a voiceover narration designed to make it fit the story better.

For years, the complete version of Final Curtain was considered a lost film, until a copy was discovered by Jason Insalaco, great-nephew of  actor Paul Marco (who had appeared in several Ed Wood projects). The restored film was premiered at the Slamdance Film Festival on January 23, 2012 and is now available on DVD.

References

External links
 
 

1957 films
1957 television specials
Films directed by Ed Wood
Films produced by Ed Wood
1950s American television specials
1957 in American television
Films with screenplays by Ed Wood
Television films as pilots
Television pilots not picked up as a series
1950s rediscovered films
American television films
Rediscovered American films
1950s English-language films